Aldo Weber Vieira da Rosa (November 15, 1917 – June 8, 2015) was a professor emeritus of electrical engineering at Stanford University. His research interests were in ionospheric processes, energy processes and renewable energy. He is the author of "Fundamentals of Renewable Energy Processes" and "Fundamentals of Electronics". He is also the holder of a US patent on the process for the production of ammonia.

Biography 
Da Rosa was born in Florianópolis, Brazil. After graduating from the Brazilian Military Academy and the Military School of Realengo both in Rio de Janeiro, he entered the Brazilian Air Force. In the early 1940s he was stationed in the US as part of a cooperative military program, and during this time he was relocated from Washington, D.C., to the Alameda Naval Air Station in the San Francisco Bay Area. This gave him the opportunity to attend Stanford for the first time and to study electrical engineering. Although he did not have an undergraduate degree, his technical experience enabled him to be admitted into the graduate program. He completed an electrical engineering degree and around the same time, in 1944, he married fellow Stanford student Aili Ranta (M.S., 1943) and moved to Harvard University. In 1945 Aldo moved back to Brazil with his new wife.

For the next twenty years Aldo was extraordinarily active in the nascent aerospace industry in Brazil, while still attached to the Brazilian Air Force. From 1945 to 1951 he founded and was the first head of the research and standardization division of the Diretoria de Rotas Aéreas (the Brazilian FAA). Then, from 1952 to 1953 he was associate professor of electronics at ITA, an engineering college in São José dos Campos. In 1954 he founded and was the first director of the Instituto de Pesquinas e Desenvolvimento and in 1956 he became chairman of the Brazilian National Research Council. He resigned from this council following a serious injury to his leg during an international glider competition in France. From 1961 to 1963 he founded and was first chairman of the Instituto Nacional de Pesquisas Espacias, the Brazilian equivalent of NASA. Following all these activities, he returned to Stanford in 1963, with his family, to obtain a Ph.D. In the early 1960s, da Rosa was a helicopter test pilot for the "Beija Flor", a helicopter designed by Heinrich Focke.

Da Rosa retired from the Brazilian Air Force as Brigadier General in 1965 and completed his Stanford Ph.D. in electrical engineering in 1966 under Owen K. Garriott. His research involved the first full-physics model of the electron distribution in the ionosphere including thermal processes to describe the electron and ion temperatures. This model predicted the total electron content  of the ionosphere that was first measured at Stanford University using radio signals from the Soviet Union's Sputnik, a particularly important topic at the time given the developing competition in space between the U.S. and the Soviet Union. Appointed a research associate in 1966, and then a senior research associate (1969–1980), da Rosa became a professor in electrical engineering in 1980. During this time, his interests gradually turned more to the fundamentals of energy processes and renewable energy. His classes on renewable energy were greatly appreciated by the students and he continued teaching these energy classes until 2011, well after his retirement in 1983.

An active masters swimmer, da Rosa broke 99 national records and 37 world records. He currently still holds the world records in the 85-89 age group in the 200 meter IM and 200 meter breast stroke. He was inducted into the International Masters Swimming Hall of Fame in 2004.

In March 2010, da Rosa was awarded the Grã-Cruz da Ordem Nacional do Mérito Científico, an honor bestowed by the president of Brazil upon Brazilian and foreign personalities recognized for their scientific and technical contributions to the cause and development of science in Brazil.

Da Rosa attracted large numbers of students to his renewable energy classes at Stanford. He lectured on renewable energy topics, with an emphasis on classical physics. Da Rosa died in Palo Alto, California at the age of 97 on June 8, 2015.

Footnotes

References
 Stanford Bio Page
 Stories About USMS Swimmers

1917 births
2015 deaths
Brazilian engineers
Da Rosa, Aldo
Da Rosa, Aldo
Recipients of the Great Cross of the National Order of Scientific Merit (Brazil)
People from Florianópolis
Stanford University faculty
Brazilian emigrants to the United States